Fernando (born 12 December 1976 in Oviedo, Spain) is a member of the Asturian power metal band WarCry. He is working on a new alternative/power metal band called Sauze formed by himself, along with Manuel Ramil, Alberto Ardines, and Toni Amboaje.

Career
When he was eight years old, he was interested in the keyboard and the flute. Two years later he began studying music theory, rhythm, piano and organ. When he was 13 he began to play the guitar, the instrument he would focus on.

He knew Alberto Rionda, through whom he joined the Asturian Power metal band Avalanch which was being formed. He was 17 years old and he was competent on the keyboard. During that time he met Víctor García (from WarCry).

He then left the band because he wanted to focus on his guitar-studies, and rejoined later. In 2001 he was fired from Avalanch, along with Alberto Ardines. His friend Víctor García asked him to join the band. At first he only collaborated on their debut self-titled album WarCry.

However, following the album release he was invited to join the band and accepted. Since 2002 he has worked on all the band's albums.

On 25 August 2007 he participated in his last concert with WarCry.  Four days later he decided to leave the band, along with Alberto Ardines.

Discography

WarCry 
 2002 — El Sello De Los Tiempos
 2004 — Alea Jacta Est
 2005 — ¿Dónde Está La Luz?
 2006 — Directo A La Luz
 2006 — La Quinta Esencia

Sauze 
 2008 — Nada Tiene Sentido

Collaborations
 2002 — WarCry

References

WarCry (band) members
People from Asturias
Living people
People from Oviedo
1976 births
Avalanch members